Shana Monica Ferrell (born November 8, 1975) is an American poet and fiction writer. In 2007 she was awarded the Kathryn A. Morton Prize for her debut book of poems, Beasts for the Chase. Her novel The Answer Is Always Yes was published by Random House in 2008. Her third book, a poetry collection entitled You Darling Thing, was published by Four Way Books in 2018 and was named a New & Noteworthy selection by The New York Times. It became a finalist for the Believer Book Award in Poetry and for the Kingsley Tufts Poetry Award.

Early life and education
Ferrell was born in New Delhi, India to a Punjabi mother and an American father. She received a bachelor's degree from Harvard University and a Master of Fine Arts from Columbia University's School of the Arts and is married to poet and editor Michael Dumanis. Currently she is the Doris and Carl Kempner Distinguished Professor at Purchase College (SUNY).

Career
Ferrell won the "Discovery"/The Nation prize in 2001. From 2002 to 2004 she was a Stegner Fellow at Stanford University. Her writing has appeared in A Public Space, The Baffler, Black Clock, Fence, Gulf Coast, New England Review, The New Republic, The New Yorker, The New York Review of Books, The Paris Review, Ploughshares, Tin House, and The Yale Review, and in anthologies such as Language for a New Century: Contemporary Poetry from the Middle East, Asia, and Beyond (W.W. Norton), The HarperCollins Book of English Poetry (HarperCollins India), and The Penguin Book of Indian Poets (Penguin India).

Bibliography
2008:Beasts for the Chase (poetry, Sarabande Books)
2008:The Answer Is Always Yes (novel, Random House)
2018:You Darling Thing (poetry, Four Way Books)

Honors and awards
 "Discovery/The Nation prize in 2001
finalist for the Asian American Writers' Workshop Prize in Poetry
fellowships from the MacDowell Colony and the Civitella Ranieri Foundation
Wallace Stegner Fellowship from Stanford University
finalist for the Kingsley Tufts Poetry Award

References 

1975 births
Living people
Harvard University alumni
Columbia University School of the Arts alumni
State University of New York at Purchase faculty
American women writers of Indian descent
People from New Delhi
21st-century American poets
21st-century American novelists
American women poets
American women novelists
21st-century American women writers
American poets of Asian descent
Indian emigrants to the United States
American novelists of Indian descent
American people of Punjabi descent